Afrasura violacea is a moth of the subfamily Arctiinae. It is found in the Democratic Republic of Congo, Ghana, Kenya, Rwanda, and Uganda.

References

External links

Moths described in 2006
violacea
Moths of Africa